The 1970 Western Championships, also known as the Cincinnati Open, was a combined men's and women's tennis tournament played on outdoor clay courts at the Cincinnati Tennis Club in Cincinnati, Ohio in the United States that was part of the 1970 Pepsi-Cola Grand Prix circuit. The tournament was held from July 20 through July 26, 1970. Ken Rosewall and Rosie Casals won the singles titles.

Finals

Men's singles
 Ken Rosewall defeated  Cliff Richey 7–9, 9–7, 8–6

Women's singles
 Rosie Casals defeated  Nancy Richey 6–3, 6–3

Men's doubles
 Ilie Năstase /  Ion Ţiriac defeated  Bob Hewitt /  Frew McMillan 6–3, 6–4

Women's doubles
 Rosie Casals /  Gail Chanfreau defeated  Helen Gourlay /  Pat Walkden 12–10, 6–1

References

External links
 
 ATP – tournament profile
 ITF – tournament edition details

Cincinnati Open
Cincinnati Masters
1970 in American tennis
Cincinnati Open
Cincinnati Open
Cincin